The Bank of American Samoa was founded in 1914 but since 2018 no longer exists.

History
In 1914 Governor C. D. Stearns established the bank in American Samoa, with its headquarters at Pago Pago. On 25 July 1929, under the direction of Governor Stephen Victor Graham, the bank received a more solid legal foundation .

In 1969 Bank of Hawaii (BOH) acquired the bank, which at the time had three branches. BOH amalgamated Bank of American Samoa and operated two branches in Pago Pago, Tutuila.

In 2018, BOH donated its branches to the newly formed public bank, the Territorial Bank of American Samoa.

References

Further reading
Bryan, Capt. Henry Francis, USN. 1927. American Samoa: A General Report by the Governor. Washington, DC: US Government Printing Office, p. 98.
Noble, A.M. 1931. Codification of the Regulations and Orders for the Government of American Samoa: Customs, Immigration and Harbor Regulations, American Samoa. Printed for the Use of the American Samoan Commission. Washington, D.C.: US Government Printing Office.
Tschoegl, A.E. 2005. Foreign Banks in the Pacific: A Note. Journal of Pacific History.

Defunct banks of the United States
Banks established in 1914
Banks based in American Samoa